Helen Peters (born 1942) is a Canadian scholar of English literature and a specialist in the theatre of Newfoundland. She is a winner of the British Academy's Rose Mary Crawshay Prize for 1981.

Life

Helen Ruth Katherine Peters was born in 1942 in St. John's, Newfoundland.

Helen Peters obtained B.A. (1971) and M.A. (1972) degrees in English from the Memorial University of Newfoundland. She was a holder of the University Medal in English in 1971. She went to Somerville College, Oxford for doctoral studies, where she was a Mary Somerville Fellow. She obtained a DPhil degree in 1978 with a thesis on John Donne.

She joined the faculty of Memorial University in 1984. She was elected to the university's Senate in 1993.

Peters was a member of the board of the Newfoundland Quarterly, a cultural and literary journal.

She retired in 2004.

Research
In 1980, Peters edited and produced the first critical text of John Donne's Paradoxes and Problems. This program had been started by Evelyn Simpson and continued by Helen Gardiner, under whom Peters worked on her doctoral dissertation, which led to the publication of this text. She incorporated ten paradoxes and nineteen problems into the canon, discarding two paradoxes as possibly inauthentic. She showed that Donne's first edition of the work in 1633 had omissions and corruptions, rendering it unsuitable for a modern standard text, and used material from subsequent prints to create her critical text. Her derivation of Donne's paradoxes from the classical style of argumentation (the mock encomium and the argument against received opinion) was well articulated but her dating of the works and placement in relation to Donne's poetry was deemed problematic, given the large amount of extant counter-evidence that showed affinities between the paradoxes and his prose rather than his verse. The book won the British Academy's Rose Mary Crawshay Prize in 1981.

Peters shifted her attention to the theatre of Newfoundland with her edition of The Plays of CODCO (1992), a professional alternative dramatics group known for its monologues, mime, dance and tough humour. A socially activist troupe, CODCO helped to counter mainland Canadian views of Newfoundlanders as simple-minded fishermen. She explored cultural identity in the theatre and in 1994, convened a workshop for the International Federation for Theatre Research, which resulted in a special publication of the journal Theatre Research International, edited by her.

In 1996, she edited and published a collection of Newfoundland and Labrador plays, Stars  in  the  Sky  Morning.

Selected works

References 

1942 births
People from St. John's, Newfoundland and Labrador
Memorial University of Newfoundland alumni
Academic staff of the Memorial University of Newfoundland
Fellows of Somerville College, Oxford
Canadian academics of English literature
Rose Mary Crawshay Prize winners
Living people